Luca Simeoni (born September 8, 1990 in La Spezia) is an Italian professional football player currently playing for Pianese.

Career

Simeoni made his Serie A debut for A.S. Livorno Calcio on April 17, 2010 in the game against A.C. ChievoVerona when he came on as a substitute in the 79th minute for Martin Bergvold.

On August 12, 2010 Simeoni moved on loan to Pergocrema in Lega Pro Prima Divisione. He spent the entire 2010-2011 season with Pergocrema scoring three goals in 20 appearances. After the season, he returned to Livorno.

July 28, 2011 Simeoni was sold on a co-ownership deal to Lega Pro Seconda Divisione outfit Alessandria. He was bought back by Livorno on January 31, the last dat of the transferwindow. Livorno then sold him again on a co-ownership deal to Virtus Entella in Lega Pro Seconda Divisione.

References

External links
 

1990 births
Living people
Italian footballers
Serie A players
U.S. Livorno 1915 players
U.S. Pergolettese 1932 players
U.S. Alessandria Calcio 1912 players
Association football forwards